Kitsikis may refer to:

 Nicolas Kitsikis (born 1887), Greek engineer
 Dimitri Kitsikis (born 1935), Greek Turkologist